Anita Carey (born 16 April 1948) is an English actress, best known for playing Joyce Smedley in Coronation Street and later for playing Vivien March in Doctors. Carey has appeared in British television programmes since the 1970s.

Career
Carey trained at the Central School of Speech and Drama. Some of her early roles were in programmes such as Z-Cars, Dixon of Dock Green, I Didn't Know You Cared and Whatever Happened to the Likely Lads?. She also appeared in the Ripping Yarns episode "The Testing of Eric Olthwaite". She made three appearances in ITV1's 1960s Yorkshire-based drama Heartbeat, the first time in series 2 in 1993 as gamekeeper's wife Helen Rawlings and then in 2003 as PC Steve Crane's mother, Babs Crane.

In Coronation Street, Carey was cast in the part of Joyce Smedley from 1996 to 1997.

In 2005, Carey played in Midsomer Murders (The House in the Woods) in the role of Barbara Flux. In 2006, Carey had a small role as a voice actress playing Venat in the PlayStation 2 game Final Fantasy XII.

She played the role of receptionist Vivien March in Doctors from 17 May 2007 to 20 March 2009. For this role, Carey was honoured at the 2009 British Soap Awards with the award for 'Best Dramatic Performance'. Her rape storyline also earned the show two additional awards, including 'Best Storyline'.

In 2013, she appeared as Gower in Shakespeare's Pericles, Prince of Tyre at Berkeley Repertory Theatre.

Personal life
Carey lives with actor and director Mark Wing-Davey.

References

External links
 

1948 births
Living people
Alumni of the Royal Central School of Speech and Drama
English television actresses
Actors from Halifax, West Yorkshire
Actresses from Yorkshire
English soap opera actresses